Renewal2 Investment Fund is a Canadian social venture capital fund that invests in early stage environmental and social mission companies in Canada and the United States. The fund focuses on companies in the following sectors: organic and natural food, green consumer products, green building products, environmental innovation, social finance, and social media.

The fund, which is based in Vancouver, Canada, was founded May 25, 2009.

History
The fund was founded in 2009 by Joel Solomon, Carol Newell, and Paul Richardson.

Investments
Currently, Renewal2 has ten companies in its portfolio: Alter Eco, Aquatic Informatics, Better Energy Systems, Elevation Brands, Miovision, Playback, Rustic Crust, Sensible Organics, Seventh Generation, and SPUD.

Renewal2 made its first successful exit in 2011, with the sale of shares from Horizon Distributors.

References

External links
Renewal2 website
Renewal Partners website

Venture capital firms of Canada
Private equity firms of Canada